Jacob Norris may refer to:
Jacob Norris (rugby union), New Zealand rugby union player
A character in  BioShock 2#Multiplayer